5-Fluoro-DET (5F-DET, 5-fluoro-N,N-diethyltryptamine) is a tryptamine derivative related to drugs such as DET and 5-MeO-DET. It acts as an inhibitor of the enzyme myeloperoxidase, and is also thought to be an agonist at the 5-HT2A receptor.

See also 
 5F-DMT
 5F-MET
 5F-EPT
 6F-DET

References 

Psychedelic tryptamines
Tryptamines
Fluoroarenes